Ishmael Peak is a conspicuous detached rock peak in eastern Voden Heights,  south of Spouter Peak, which marks the north side of the mouth of Leppard Glacier, on the east coast of Graham Land, Antarctica. It was surveyed by the Falkland Islands Dependencies Survey in 1947 and 1955, and was named by the UK Antarctic Place-Names Committee after Ishmael, the narrator of Herman Melville's story Moby-Dick.

References

Mountains of Graham Land
Oscar II Coast